Sightly is an unincorporated community in Cowlitz County, Washington. Sightly is located east of the city of Castle Rock and east of Silver Lake. The Sightly community was given its name due to its views of Mount St. Helens. The Sightly community is part of the Toutle Lake School District, a K-12 school district of about 600 students.

The eruption of Mount St. Helens on May 18, 1980, was the deadliest and most economically destructive volcanic event in the history of the United States.

Geography
Sightly is located at  (46.2998338, -122.7084437).

External links
Toutle Lake School District website

References

Unincorporated communities in Cowlitz County, Washington
Unincorporated communities in Washington (state)